Marton may refer to:

Places

England
 Marton, Blackpool, district of Blackpool, Lancashire
 Marton, Bridlington, area of Bridlington in the East Riding of Yorkshire
 Marton, Cheshire, village and civil parish in Cheshire
 Marton, Cumbria, village in Cumbria
 Marton, East Riding of Yorkshire, hamlet in the East Riding of Yorkshire
 Marton, Harrogate, village in North Yorkshire
 Marton, Lincolnshire, village in Lincolnshire
 Marton, Middlesbrough, suburb of Middlesbrough
 Marton, Myddle, Broughton and Harmer Hill, a location in Shropshire
 Marton, Ryedale, village in North Yorkshire
 Marton, Shropshire or Marton-in-Chirbury, village in Shropshire
 Marton, Warwickshire, village in Warwickshire
 Marton-in-the-Forest, North Yorkshire
 Marton-le-Moor, village in North Yorkshire
 Long Marton, parish of Eden, Cumbria
 Whitegate and Marton, parish of Vale Royal, Cheshire

Elsewhere
 Marton, New Zealand, town in the Manawatu-Wanganui region
 Marton, Queensland, town in the Shire of Cook, Queensland, Australia

People

Given name
 Márton Balázs (1929–2016), Romanian mathematician of Hungarian descent
 Marton Csokas (born 1966), New Zealand actor
 Márton Fucsovics (born 1992), Hungarian tennis player
 Márton Vas (born 1980), Hungarian ice hockey player

Surname
 Andrew Marton (1904–1992), Hungarian-American film director
 Áron Márton (1896–1980), Roman Catholic bishop
 Brian Marton, Australian sprint canoer
 Dana Marton, American romance novelist
 Edvin Marton (born 1974), Hungarian violinist and composer
 Ervin Marton (1912–1968), Hungarian and French artist and photographer
 Éva Marton (born 1943), Hungarian operatic soprano
 Ference Marton (born 1939), Swedish educational psychologist
 George Marton (1839–1905) (1835–1905), British Conservative politician
 Jack Marton, Australian taekwondo practitioner
 Jirina Marton (born 1946), Czech-born Canadian artist and illustrator
 Kati Marton (born 1949), American author and journalist
 László Marton (director) (1943–2019), Hungarian theatrical director
 Sandra Marton, American novelist
 Sandy Marton (born 1959), Croatian singer
 Avinoam Marton, Israeli drummer and singer, member of Teapacks between 1991 and 1994

Other uses
 MV Marton, a British coaster

See also 
 Marten (disambiguation)
 Martin (name), a given name and a surname